Joseph or Joe Burke may refer to:

Sports
 Joe Burke (baseball executive) (1923–1992), American Major League Baseball executive
 Joseph Burke (cricketer) (1923–2005), Irish cricketer
 Joe Burke (infielder) (1867–1940), 19th-century baseball player
 Joe Burke (outfielder), baseball right fielder in the Negro leagues
 Joe Burke (New Zealand footballer), New Zealand international football (soccer) player
 Joe Burke (rugby league) (born 1990), rugby league footballer for Wales, and South Wales Scorpions
 Joe Burke (American football) (born 1961), American football player

Musicians
 Joe Burke (accordionist) (1939–2021), Irish accordion player
 Joe Burke (composer) (1884–1950), American actor, composer and pianist
 Sonny Burke (Joseph Francis Burke, 1914–1980), American musician

Others
 Joseph Burke (botanist) (1812–1873), English collector of plants and animals
 Joseph Burke (politician) (1853– after 1888), land surveyor and political figure in Manitoba
 Joseph A. Burke (1886–1962), bishop of Buffalo
 Joseph Burke (judge) (1888–1990), Illinois judge
 Joseph C. Burke (born 1932), American educator
 Joseph Burke, a World War II veteran in the novel Double Play from Robert B. Parker
 Sir Joseph Burke, 11th Baronet of the Burke baronets

See also
 Burke (surname)
 Joe Burk (1914–2008), American oarsman and coach
 Joe Burks (1899–1968), American football player
 Joseph Berke, American psychotherapist
 Joseph M. Burck (1931–2020), senior designer and toy inventor at Marvin Glass and Associates